FK Srem Jakovo is a football club based in Jakovo, Belgrade, Serbia. They compete in the Belgrade Inter-Municipal League, the sixth tier of the national league system.

History
In the 2001–02 season, the club placed second in the Serbian League Belgrade and earned promotion to the Second League of FR Yugoslavia. They would compete in Group North, but finished bottom of the table in their only appearance in the second tier. The club subsequently suffered relegation from the Serbian League Belgrade in the 2003–04 season.

After winning the 2004–05 Belgrade Zone League, the club spent 11 consecutive seasons in the Serbian League Belgrade, the third tier of the national league pyramid. They also reached the round of 16 in the 2010–11 Serbian Cup, losing to Vojvodina on penalties.

Honours
Belgrade Zone League (Tier 4)
 2004–05

Notable players
This is a list of players who have played at full international level.
  Vladimir Rodić
  Miloš Bogunović
  Bojan Isailović
  Marko Jevtović
For a list of all FK Srem Jakovo players with a Wikipedia article, see :Category:FK Srem Jakovo players.

Managerial history

References

External links
 Club page at Srbijasport

1927 establishments in Serbia
Association football clubs established in 1927
Football clubs in Serbia
Football clubs in Belgrade
Surčin